Charles Morin may refer to:

 Charles Morin, pseudonym used for painting by Winston Churchill (1874–1965)
 Charles R. Morin (1870–1947), American carom billiards player
 Charles Morin, pseudonym of Belgian opera singer Armand Crabbé (1883–1947)